Saltzberg is a surname. Notable people with the surname include:

David Saltzberg (born 1967), American physicist
Katherine Saltzberg (born 1962), American actress
Sarah Saltzberg, American actress and singer

See also
 Salzberg (disambiguation)
 Salzburg (disambiguation)